Women's shot put events for wheelchair athletes were held at the 2004 Summer Paralympics in the Athens Olympic Stadium. Events were held in three disability classes, F52/53 being held jointly with F32-34 cerebral palsy athletes.

F32-34/52/53

F54/55

The F54/55 event was won by Marianne Buggenhagen, representing .

19 September. 2004, 17:00

F56-58

The F56-58 event was won by Nadia Medjmedj, representing .

20 September. 2004, 17:00

References

W
2004 in women's athletics